Dennis Hollart (born 13 November 1983) is a Dutch footballer who plays as a centre-back for Eemdijk.

Career
He made his Eerste Divisie league debut with Omniworld during the 2005–06 season. Hollart also played for Go Ahead Eagles.

In December 2018, Hollart announced that he would retire at the end of the season.

On 20 November 2020, Hollart came out of retirement and signed a one-and-a-half-year contract with Eemdijk at age 37.

References

1983 births
Living people
Association football fullbacks
Dutch footballers
Almere City FC players
Go Ahead Eagles players
Eerste Divisie players
Derde Divisie players
DVS '33 players
Footballers from Lelystad
Vierde Divisie players
SC Heerenveen players
IJsselmeervogels players